This is a list of the players on the rosters of the teams participating in the 2008 Beijing Olympics in Men's Handball.

Group A

The following is the Brazil roster in the men's handball tournament of the 2008 Summer Olympics.

Head coach:  Jordi Ribera

The following is the China roster in the men's handball tournament of the 2008 Summer Olympics.

Head coach:  Yam Weiming

The following is the Croatia roster in the men's handball tournament of the 2008 Summer Olympics.

Head coach: Lino Cervar

The following is the France roster in the men's handball tournament of the 2008 Summer Olympics.

Head coach: Claude Onesta

The following is the Poland roster in the men's handball tournament of the 2008 Summer Olympics.

Head coach: Bogdan Wenta

The following is the Spain roster in the men's handball tournament of the 2008 Summer Olympics.

Head coach: Juan Carlos Pastor

Group B

The following is the Denmark roster in the men's handball tournament of the 2008 Summer Olympics.

Head coach: Ulrik Wilbek

Notes

The following is the Egypt roster in the men's handball tournament of the 2008 Summer Olympics.

Head coach:  Irfan Smajlagic

The following is the Germany roster in the men's handball tournament of the 2008 Summer Olympics.

Head coach: Heiner Brand

The following is the Iceland roster in the men's handball tournament of the 2008 Summer Olympics.

Head coach: Guðmundur Guðmundsson

The following is the South Korea roster in the women's handball tournament of the 2008 Summer Olympics.

Head coach: Kim Tae-hoon

The following is the Russia roster in the men's handball tournament of the 2008 Summer Olympics.

Head coach: Vladimir Maksimov

References

Men's team rosters
2008 Summer Olympics

Men's events at the 2008 Summer Olympics